Triodia laetus is a species of moth belonging to the family Hepialidae. It was described by Staudinger in 1877, and is known from Central Russia and Armenia.

References

External links
Hepialidae genera

Hepialidae
Moths described in 1877
Moths of Asia
Taxa named by Otto Staudinger